Tornatellides lordhowensis, also known as the Lord Howe miniature treesnail, is a species of tree snail that is endemic to Australia's Lord Howe Island in the Tasman Sea.

Description
The globose, ovately conical shell of adult snails is 2.4–2.6 mm in height, with a diameter of 2–2.1 mm, with weakly impressed sutures and rounded whorls with fine spiral grooves. It is pale gold in colour. The umbilicus is narrowly open. The aperture is subovate.

Habitat
The snail occurs mainly in the central part of the island, in rainforest and low littoral vegetation, inhabiting leaf litter and the leaves of grasses and shrubs.

References

 
lordhowensis
Gastropods of Lord Howe Island
Gastropods described in 2010